The Colorado Rockies' 2001 season was the ninth for the Rockies. They tried to win the National League West. Buddy Bell was their manager. They played home games at Coors Field. They finished with a record of 73–89, last in the NL West.

Offseason
November 7, 2000: Mark Little was signed as a free agent by the Colorado Rockies.
December 4, 2000: Denny Neagle was signed as a free agent by the Colorado Rockies.
December 10, 2000: Ron Gant was signed as a free agent by the Colorado Rockies.
December 12, 2000: Mike Hampton was signed as a free agent by the Colorado Rockies.
January 5, 2001: Greg Norton was signed as a free agent by the Colorado Rockies.
March 28, 2001: Masato Yoshii was released by the Colorado Rockies.

Regular season
Rockies pitcher Jason Jennings became the first pitcher since 1901 to throw a shutout and hit a home run in his first Major League game.

Season standings

Record vs. opponents

Notable transactions
April 25, 2001: Ubaldo Jiménez was signed as an amateur free agent by the Rockies.
May 29, 2001: Justin Speier was selected off waivers by the Colorado Rockies from the New York Mets.
 June 24, 2001: Brent Mayne was traded by the Colorado Rockies to the Kansas City Royals for Sal Fasano and Mac Suzuki.
July 13, 2001: Chone Figgins was traded by the Colorado Rockies to the Anaheim Angels for Kimera Bartee.
July 19, 2001: Todd Walker was traded by the Colorado Rockies with Robin Jennings to the Cincinnati Reds for Alex Ochoa.
July 25, 2001: Neifi Pérez was traded by the Colorado Rockies to the Kansas City Royals for Jermaine Dye. Dye was then traded by the Rockies to the Oakland Athletics for José Ortiz, Todd Belitz, and Mario Encarnación.
July 31, 2001: Pedro Astacio was traded by the Colorado Rockies to the Houston Astros for Scott Elarton.
August 23, 2001: Gary Bennett was traded by the New York Mets to the Colorado Rockies for a player to be named later.  The Colorado Rockies sent Ender Chavez (minors) (December 27, 2001) to the New York Mets to complete the trade.
September 12, 2001: Ross Gload was selected off waivers by the Colorado Rockies from the Chicago Cubs.

Major League debuts
Batters:
Juan Uribe (Apr 8)
Cliff Brumbaugh (May 30)
Brent Butler (Jul 4)
Mario Encarnación (Aug 26)
Pitchers:
Tim Christman (Apr 21)
Shawn Chacón (Apr 29)
Jason Jennings (Aug 23)

Roster

Game log 

|-  style="text-align:center; background:#bfb;"
| 1 || April 2 || Cardinals || 8–0 || Hampton (1–0) || Kile (0–1) || || 48,113 || 1–0
|-  style="text-align:center; background:#bfb;"
| 2 || April 4 || Cardinals || 13–9 || Neagle (1–0) || Benes (0–1) || Jiménez (1) || 36,667 || 2–0
|-  style="text-align:center; background:#bfb;"
| 3 || April 5 || Cardinals || 11–2 || Astacio (1–0) || Morris (0–1) || || 35,142 || 3–0
|-  style="text-align:center; background:#fbb;"
| 4 || April 6 || Padres || 10–6 || Eaton (1–0) || Bohanon (0–1) || || 37,431 || 3–1
|-  style="text-align:center; background:#fbb;"
| 5 || April 7 || Padres || 14–10 || Williams (1–0) || Myers (0–1) || Hoffman (1) || 41,026 || 3–2
|-  style="text-align:center; background:#fbb;"
| 6 || April 8 || Padres || 11–3 || Tollberg (1–0) || Estrada (0–1) || || 40,446 || 3–3
|-  style="text-align:center; background:#fbb;"
| 7 || April 9 || @ Cardinals || 3–2 || Timlin (1–0) || White (0–1) || || 48,702 || 3–4
|-  style="text-align:center; background:#fbb;"
| 8 || April 11 || @ Cardinals || 3–1 || Morris (1–1) || Astacio (1–1) || Veres (1) || 30,115 || 3–5
|-  style="text-align:center; background:#bfb;"
| 9 || April 12 || @ Cardinals || 6–4 || Wasdin (1–0) || Kline (0–1) || Jiménez (2) || 35,127 || 4–5
|-  style="text-align:center; background:#fbb;"
| 10 || April 13 || Diamondbacks || 7–3 || Johnson (2–1) || Bohanon (0–2) || || 38,564 || 4–6
|-  style="text-align:center; background:#bfb;"
| 11 || April 14 || Diamondbacks || 9–8 || Myers (1–1) || Kim (0–1) || Jiménez (3) || 42,319 || 5–6
|-  style="text-align:center; background:#bfb;"
| 12 || April 15 || Diamondbacks || 10–7 (10) || Estrada (1–1) || Brohawn (0–1) || || 36,841 || 6–6
|-  style="text-align:center; background:#bfb;"
| 13 || April 17 || @ Padres || 9–5 || Astacio (2–1) || Jones (0–2) || Jiménez (4) || 16,615 || 7–6
|-  style="text-align:center; background:#bfb;"
| 14 || April 18 || @ Padres || 8–0 || Hampton (2–0) || Eaton (2–1) || || 17,040 || 8–6
|-  style="text-align:center; background:#bfb;"
| 15 || April 19 || @ Padres || 4–0 || Neagle (2–0) || Williams (1–2) || || 15,896 || 9–6
|-  style="text-align:center; background:#fbb;"
| 16 || April 20 || @ Diamondbacks || 3–2 || Kim (1–1) || White (0–2) || || 32,011 || 9–7
|-  style="text-align:center; background:#fbb;"
| 17 || April 21 || @ Diamondbacks || 10–5 || Ellis (2–0) || Villone (0–1) || || 31,724 || 9–8
|-  style="text-align:center; background:#bfb;"
| 18 || April 22 || @ Diamondbacks || 2–1 || Astacio (3–1) || Reynoso (1–3) || Jiménez (5) || 31,076 || 10–8
|-  style="text-align:center; background:#bfb;"
| 19 || April 24 || Cubs || 14–1 || Hampton (3–0) || Tapani (3–1) || || 43,562 || 11–8
|-  style="text-align:center; background:#bfb;"
| 20 || April 25 || Cubs || 6–5 || Jiménez (1–0) || Duncan (1–1) || || 42,514 || 12–8
|-  style="text-align:center; background:#fbb;"
| 21 || April 26 || Cubs || 7–2 || Lieber (2–1) || Bohanon (0–3) || || 47,336 || 12–9
|-  style="text-align:center; background:#fbb;"
| 22 || April 27 || Reds || 12–9 || Mercado (1–0) || Myers (1–2) || Graves (8) || 44,502 || 12–10
|-  style="text-align:center; background:#fbb;"
| 23 || April 28 || Reds || 9–4 || Dessens (2–1) || Davis (0–1) || || 47,143 || 12–11
|-  style="text-align:center; background:#bfb;"
| 24 || April 29 || Reds || 14–7 || Wasdin (2–0) || Mercado (1–1) || Jiménez (6) || 47,047 || 13–11
|-

|-  style="text-align:center; background:#fbb;"
| 25 || May 1 || @ Phillies || 7–1 || Daal (3–0) || Neagle (2–1) || || 14,138 || 13–12
|-  style="text-align:center; background:#bfb;"
| 26 || May 2 || @ Phillies || 6–2 || Bohanon (1–3) || Person (2–3) || Jiménez (7) || 13,243 || 14–12
|-  style="text-align:center; background:#fbb;"
| 27 || May 3 || @ Phillies || 7–5 || Telemaco (3–0) || Astacio (3–2) || || 17,383 || 14–13
|-  style="text-align:center; background:#bfb;"
| 28 || May 4 || @ Pirates || 9–3 || Hampton (4–0) || Arroyo (2–3) || || 32,653 || 15–13
|-  style="text-align:center; background:#fbb;"
| 29 || May 5 || @ Pirates || 11–3 || Olivares (2–3) || Chacón (0–1) || || 37,596 || 15–14
|-  style="text-align:center; background:#fbb;"
| 30 || May 6 || @ Pirates || 4–3 (11) || Beimel (2–0) || White (0–3) || || 34,915 || 15–15
|-  style="text-align:center; background:#fbb;"
| 31 || May 7 || Mets || 10–9 || Gonzalez (1–0) || Bohanon (1–4) || || 34,644 || 15–16
|-  style="text-align:center; background:#bfb;"
| 32 || May 8 || Mets || 12–4 || Astacio (4–2) || Appier (2–3) || || 36,602 || 16–16
|-  style="text-align:center; background:#bfb;"
| 33 || May 9 || Mets || 6–0 || Hampton (5–0) || Reed (4–2) || || 35,952 || 17–16
|-  style="text-align:center; background:#bfb;"
| 34 || May 10 || Mets || 8–2 || Chacón (1–1) || Rusch (2–2) || || 40,603 || 18–16
|-  style="text-align:center; background:#bfb;"
| 35 || May 11 || Expos || 13–4 || Neagle (3–1) || Peters (2–3) || || 43,680 || 19–16
|-  style="text-align:center; background:#fbb;"
| 36 || May 12 || Expos || 8–4 || Armas (2–5) || Thomson (0–1) || || 43,730 || 19–17
|-  style="text-align:center; background:#fbb;"
| 37 || May 13 || Expos || 14–10 || Lloyd (3–1) || Astacio (4–3) || || 42,235 || 19–18
|-  style="text-align:center; background:#fbb;"
| 38 || May 15 || @ Braves || 5–3 || Remlinger (2–1) || Hampton (5–1) || Rocker (10) || 28,921 || 19–19
|-  style="text-align:center; background:#fbb;"
| 39 || May 16 || @ Braves || 6–4 || Cabrera (2–0) || Wasdin (2–1) || Rocker (11) || 32,461 || 19–20
|-  style="text-align:center; background:#bfb;"
| 40 || May 17 || @ Braves || 8–3 || Neagle (4–1) || Smoltz (0–1) || || 31,221 || 20–20
|-  style="text-align:center; background:#fbb;"
| 41 || May 18 || @ Marlins || 2–1 || Burnett (2–1) || Astacio (4–4) || Alfonseca (8) || 20,336 || 20–21
|-  style="text-align:center; background:#fbb;"
| 42 || May 19 || @ Marlins || 1–0 || Penny (4–0) || Thomson (0–2) || Alfonseca (9) || 23,122 || 20–22
|-  style="text-align:center; background:#bfb;"
| 43 || May 20 || @ Marlins || 7–2 || Hampton (6–1) || Dempster (3–6) || || 13,367 || 21–22
|-  style="text-align:center; background:#bfb;"
| 44 || May 21 || Dodgers || 6–3 || Chacón (2–1) || Dreifort (3–3) || Jiménez (8) || 38,196 || 22–22
|-  style="text-align:center; background:#bfb;"
| 45 || May 22 || Dodgers || 11–8 || White (1–3) || Herges (1–4) || Jiménez (9) || 41,563 || 23–22
|-  style="text-align:center; background:#fbb;"
| 46 || May 23 || Dodgers || 6–4 || Brown (6–2) || Astacio (4–5) || Shaw (14) || 46,836 || 23–23
|-  style="text-align:center; background:#fbb;"
| 47 || May 24 || @ Giants || 5–1 || Estes (4–2) || Thomson (0–3) || || 40,856 || 23–24
|-  style="text-align:center; background:#bfb;"
| 48 || May 25 || @ Giants || 6–1 || Hampton (7–1) || Hernández (3–7) || || 41,341 || 24–24
|-  style="text-align:center; background:#bfb;"
| 49 || May 26 || @ Giants || 10–4 || Chacón (3–1) || Rueter (4–6) || || 41,341 || 25–24
|-  style="text-align:center; background:#fbb;"
| 50 || May 27 || @ Giants || 5–4 || Ortiz (7–3) || Neagle (4–2) || Nen (11) || 41,341 || 25–25
|-  style="text-align:center; background:#fbb;"
| 51 || May 28 || @ Dodgers || 11–10 (11) || Herges (2–4) || Villone (0–2) || || 27,812 || 25–26
|-  style="text-align:center; background:#bfb;"
| 52 || May 29 || @ Dodgers || 7–2 || Bohanon (2–4) || Brown (6–3) || || 22,570 || 26–26
|-  style="text-align:center; background:#fbb;"
| 53 || May 30 || @ Dodgers || 4–1 || Park (6–4) || Hampton (7–2) || Shaw (16) || 30,411 || 26–27
|-

|-  style="text-align:center; background:#fbb;"
| 54 || June 1 || Giants || 11–7 || Rueter (5–6) || Chacón (3–2) || || 40,630 || 26–28
|-  style="text-align:center; background:#bfb;"
| 55 || June 2 || Giants || 7–5 || Jiménez (2–0) || Nen (2–2) || || 40,657 || 27–28
|-  style="text-align:center; background:#bfb;"
| 56 || June 3 || Giants || 11–2 || Astacio (5–5) || Gardner (1–4) || || 41,684 || 28–28
|-  style="text-align:center; background:#bfb;"
| 57 || June 5 || Astros || 9–4 || Hampton (8–2) || Miller (7–3) || || 37,116 || 29–28
|-  style="text-align:center; background:#bfb;"
| 58 || June 6 || Astros || 9–8 || Bohanon (3–4) || Elarton (4–5) || Jiménez (10) || 36,138 || 30–28
|-  style="text-align:center; background:#fbb;"
| 59 || June 7 || Astros || 2–1 || Reynolds (6–4) || Chacón (3–3) || Jackson (1) || 35,359 || 30–29
|-  style="text-align:center; background:#bfb;"
| 60 || June 8 || Cardinals || 9–1 || Neagle (5–2) || Matthews (2–2) || || 46,188 || 31–29
|-  style="text-align:center; background:#fbb;"
| 61 || June 9 || Cardinals || 8–2 || Benes (5–4) || Astacio (5–6) || || 47,043 || 31–30
|-  style="text-align:center; background:#bfb;"
| 62 || June 10 || Cardinals || 12–3 || Hampton (9–2) || Hermanson (5–5) || || 47,139 || 32–30
|-  style="text-align:center; background:#fbb;"
| 63 || June 12 || Mariners || 10–9 || Fuentes (1–0) || Acevedo (0–1) || Sasaki (25) || 41,263 || 32–31
|-  style="text-align:center; background:#bfb;"
| 64 || June 14 || Mariners || 8–2 || Chacón (4–3) || Moyer (8–2) || || 45,261 || 33–31
|-  style="text-align:center; background:#fbb;"
| 65 || June 14 || Mariners || 5–1 || Abbott (6–2) || Astacio (5–7) || || 37,048 || 33–32
|-  style="text-align:center; background:#bfb;"
| 66 || June 15 || @ Reds || 8–4 || Villone (1–2) || Reitsma (3–6) || || 28,301 || 34–32
|-  style="text-align:center; background:#bfb;"
| 67 || June 16 || @ Reds || 8–7 (12) || Jiménez (3–0) || Brower (3–5) || Dingman (1) || 29,937 || 35–32
|-  style="text-align:center; background:#bfb;"
| 68 || June 17 || @ Reds || 4–3 || Bohanon (4–4) || Dessens (5–4) || Jiménez (11) || 25,947 || 36–32
|-  style="text-align:center; background:#fbb;"
| 69 || June 18 || @ Astros || 13–5 || Reynolds (7–5) || Astacio (5–8) || || 31,529 || 36–33
|-  style="text-align:center; background:#fbb;"
| 70 || June 19 || @ Astros || 6–4 || Oswalt (5–1) || Chacón (4–4) || Wagner (14) || 30,020 || 36–34
|-  style="text-align:center; background:#fbb;"
| 71 || June 20 || @ Astros || 7–2 || Miller (8–3) || Villone (1–3) || Dotel (1) || 30,637 || 36–35
|-  style="text-align:center; background:#fbb;"
| 72 || June 21 || Diamondbacks || 14–5 || Bierbrodt (2–0) || Hampton (9–3) || || 40,036 || 36–36
|-  style="text-align:center; background:#fbb;"
| 73 || June 22 || Diamondbacks || 5–4 (10) || Swindell (2–1) || Jiménez (3–1) || Prinz (7) || 44,655 || 36–37
|-  style="text-align:center; background:#fbb;"
| 74 || June 23 || Diamondbacks || 9–5 || Kim (3–2) || White (1–4) || || 41,612 || 36–38
|-  style="text-align:center; background:#bfb;"
| 75 || June 24 || Diamondbacks || 7–6 || Neagle (6–2) || Johnson (9–5) || Jiménez (12) || 41,682 || 37–38
|-  style="text-align:center; background:#fbb;"
| 76 || June 25 || Padres || 6–4 || Jarvis (4–7) || White (1–5) || Hoffman (16) || 37,141 || 37–39
|-  style="text-align:center; background:#fbb;"
| 77 || June 26 || Padres || 11–3 || Jones (4–10) || Hampton (9–4) || || 37,315 || 37–40
|-  style="text-align:center; background:#bfb;"
| 78 || June 27 || Padres || 10–9 || Jiménez (4–1) || Davey (2–3) || || 38,046 || 38–40
|-  style="text-align:center; background:#fbb;"
| 79 || June 29 || @ Diamondbacks || 5–3 || Johnson (10–5) || Astacio (5–9) || Kim (4) || 34,291 || 38–41
|-  style="text-align:center; background:#fbb;"
| 80 || June 30 || @ Diamondbacks || 6–5 || Brohawn (2–3) || Davis (0–2) || Prinz (8) || 36,165 || 38–42
|-

|-  style="text-align:center; background:#fbb;"
| 81 || July 1 || @ Diamondbacks || 5–4 (13) || Prinz (3–0) || White (1–6) || || 31,999 || 38–43
|-  style="text-align:center; background:#fbb;"
| 82 || July 3 || @ Padres || 6–5 || Núñez (1–2) || Davis (0–3) || Hoffman (17) || 25,022 || 38–44
|-  style="text-align:center; background:#fbb;"
| 83 || July 4 || @ Padres || 8–3 || Hitchcock (1–0) || Suzuki (2–6) || || 34,188 || 38–45
|-  style="text-align:center; background:#bfb;"
| 84 || July 5 || @ Padres || 4–0 || Astacio (6–9) || Eaton (8–5) || || 20,541 || 39–45
|-  style="text-align:center; background:#fbb;"
| 85 || July 6 || Angels || 6–5 || Ortiz (7–6) || Hampton (9–5) || Percival (21) || 48,576 || 39–46
|-  style="text-align:center; background:#fbb;"
| 86 || July 7 || Angels || 10–3 || Washburn (7–4) || Suzuki (2–7) || || 47,517 || 39–47
|-  style="text-align:center; background:#fbb;"
| 87 || July 8 || Angels || 11–3 || Rapp (3–9) || Chacón (4–5) || Pote (1) || 37,577 || 39–48
|-  style="text-align:center; background:#fbb;"
| 88 || July 12 || @ Rangers || 6–3 || Rogers (5–6) || Astacio (6–10) || Zimmerman (13) || 29,322 || 39–49
|-  style="text-align:center; background:#fbb;"
| 89 || July 13 || @ Rangers || 10–2 || Helling (6–8) || Hampton (9–6) || || 37,812 || 39–50
|-  style="text-align:center; background:#bfb;"
| 90 || July 14 || @ Rangers || 11–2 || Chacón (5–5) || Davis (4–7) || || 38,009 || 40–50
|-  style="text-align:center; background:#fbb;"
| 91 || July 15 || @ Athletics || 6–3 || Lidle (3–4) || Bohanon (4–5) || Vizcaíno (1) || 24,327 || 40–51
|-  style="text-align:center; background:#fbb;"
| 92 || July 16 || @ Athletics || 5–1 || Heredia (5–7) || Neagle (6–3) || || 13,808 || 40–52
|-  style="text-align:center; background:#fbb;"
| 93 || July 17 || @ Athletics || 3–2 || Mulder (11–6) || Astacio (6–11) || Isringhausen (19) || 22,099 || 40–53
|-  style="text-align:center; background:#fbb;"
| 94 || July 18 || @ Giants || 10–0 || Ortiz (11–5) || Hampton (9–7) || || 41,584 || 40–54
|-  style="text-align:center; background:#fbb;"
| 95 || July 19 || @ Giants || 2–1 || Rodríguez (5–1) || Acevedo (0–2) || || 40,850 || 40–55
|-  style="text-align:center; background:#bfb;"
| 96 || July 20 || Dodgers || 11–3 || Bohanon (5–5) || Prokopec (6–5) || || 47,704 || 41–55
|-  style="text-align:center; background:#fbb;"
| 97 || July 21 || Dodgers || 22–7 || Gagné (3–4) || Neagle (6–4) || || 43,011 || 41–56
|-  style="text-align:center; background:#fbb;"
| 98 || July 22 || Dodgers || 9–8 || Adams (6–3) || Astacio (6–12) || Shaw (28) || 40,085 || 41–57
|-  style="text-align:center; background:#bfb;"
| 99 || July 23 || Giants || 8–2 || Hampton (10–7) || Ortiz (11–6) || || 37,424 || 42–57
|-  style="text-align:center; background:#bfb;"
| 100 || July 24 || Giants || 6–4 || Chacón (6–5) || Estes (7–5) || Jiménez (13) || 40,132 || 43–57
|-  style="text-align:center; background:#fbb;"
| 101 || July 25 || Giants || 9–3 || Jensen (1–2) || Bohanon (5–6) || || 42,088 || 43–58
|-  style="text-align:center; background:#fbb;"
| 102 || July 26 || @ Dodgers || 3–1 || Gagné (4–4) || Neagle (6–5) || Shaw (30) || 32,750 || 43–59
|-  style="text-align:center; background:#fbb;"
| 103 || July 27 || @ Dodgers || 4–2 || Adams (7–3) || Astacio (6–13) || Shaw (31) || 40,114 || 43–60
|-  style="text-align:center; background:#fbb;"
| 104 || July 28 || @ Dodgers || 10–6 || Park (11–6) || Hampton (10–8) || Shaw (32) || 34,808 || 43–61
|-  style="text-align:center; background:#bfb;"
| 105 || July 29 || @ Dodgers || 3–2 || Powell (3–2) || Herges (8–8) || Jiménez (14) || 54,556 || 44–61
|-  style="text-align:center; background:#bfb;"
| 106 || July 31 || Phillies || 7–6 || Jiménez (5–1) || Cormier (5–5) || || 36,005 || 45–61
|-

|-  style="text-align:center; background:#fbb;"
| 107 || August 1 || Phillies || 8–1 (6) || Wolf (6–10) || Neagle (6–6) || || 34,024 || 45–62
|-  style="text-align:center; background:#fbb;"
| 108 || August 2 || Phillies || 4–2 || Coggin (2–1) || Thomson (0–4) || Mesa (28) || 37,075 || 45–63
|-  style="text-align:center; background:#bfb;"
| 109 || August 3 || Pirates || 12–7 || Hampton (11–8) || Anderson (6–11) || || 38,836 || 46–63
|-  style="text-align:center; background:#fbb;"
| 110 || August 4 || Pirates || 6–3 || Ritchie (8–10) || Chacón (6–6) || || 44,294 || 46–64
|-  style="text-align:center; background:#fbb;"
| 111 || August 5 || Pirates || 5–4 || Lincoln (1–0) || Bohanon (5–7) || Fetters (2) || 36,570 || 46–65
|-  style="text-align:center; background:#fbb;"
| 112 || August 7 || @ Cubs || 5–4 || Farnsworth (2–3) || Speier (2–1) || || 40,266 || 46–66
|-  style="text-align:center; background:#fbb;"
| 113 || August 8 || @ Cubs || 2–1 || Bere (8–5) || Thomson (0–5) || Gordon (23) || 38,801 || 46–67
|-  style="text-align:center; background:#bfb;"
| 114 || August 9 || @ Cubs || 14–5 || Hampton (12–8) || Tavárez (8–8) || || 38,345 || 47–67
|-  style="text-align:center; background:#bfb;"
| 115 || August 10 || @ Reds || 16–7 || Miceli (1–5) || Reitsma (5–12) || || 22,778 || 48–67
|-  style="text-align:center; background:#fbb;"
| 116 || August 11 || @ Reds || 7–3 || Acevedo (3–3) || Bohanon (5–8) || || 28,751 || 48–68
|-  style="text-align:center; background:#bfb;"
| 117 || August 12 || @ Reds || 7–6 || Powell (4–2) || Graves (5–4) || Jiménez (15) || 23,887 || 49–68
|-  style="text-align:center; background:#bfb;"
| 118 || August 14 || Braves || 5–4 (10) || Jiménez (6–1) || Karsay (1–3) || || 40,677 || 50–68
|-  style="text-align:center; background:#fbb;"
| 119 || August 15 || Braves || 7–2 || Burkett (10–8) || Hampton (12–9) || || 37,962 || 50–69
|-  style="text-align:center; background:#fbb;"
| 120 || August 16 || Braves || 4–1 || Millwood (3–5) || Chacón (6–7) || Karsay (7) || 37,086 || 50–70
|-  style="text-align:center; background:#bfb;"
| 121 || August 17 || Marlins || 12–5 || Speier (3–1) || Dempster (14–10) || || 35,512 || 51–70
|-  style="text-align:center; background:#bfb;"
| 122 || August 18 || Marlins || 8–3 || Neagle (7–6) || Almanza (1–2) || Powell (1) || 39,073 || 52–70
|-  style="text-align:center; background:#bfb;"
| 123 || August 19 || Marlins || 6–5 || Thomson (1–5) || Sánchez (2–3) || Miceli (1) || 34,525 || 53–70
|-  style="text-align:center; background:#fbb;"
| 124 || August 21 || @ Mets || 5–2 || Leiter (8–10) || Hampton (12–10) || Benítez (30) || 28,510 || 53–71
|-  style="text-align:center; background:#fbb;"
| 125 || August 22 || @ Mets || 2–1 || Appier (7–10) || Chacón (6–8) || Benítez (31) || 34,415 || 53–72
|-  style="text-align:center; background:#bfb;"
| 126 || August 23 || @ Mets || 10–0 || Jennings (1–0) || Rusch (6–9) || || 27,430 || 54–72
|-  style="text-align:center; background:#bfb;"
| 127 || August 24 || @ Brewers || 12–6 || Neagle (8–6) || Neugebauer (1–1) || || 40,647 || 55–72
|-  style="text-align:center; background:#fbb;"
| 128 || August 25 || @ Brewers || 5–4 || DeJean (4–2) || White (1–7) || Leskanic (15) || 42,139 || 55–73
|-  style="text-align:center; background:#bfb;"
| 129 || August 26 || @ Brewers || 3–2 || Hampton (13–10) || Quevedo (3–2) || Powell (2) || 42,239 || 56–73
|-  style="text-align:center; background:#bfb;"
| 130 || August 28 || @ Dodgers || 4–3 || Davis (1–3) || Shaw (3–4) || Powell (3) || 39,051 || 57–73
|-  style="text-align:center; background:#bfb;"
| 131 || August 29 || @ Dodgers || 5–3 || Jennings (2–0) || Baldwin (9–7) || Powell (4) || 27,697 || 58–73
|-  style="text-align:center; background:#fbb;"
| 132 || August 30 || @ Dodgers || 5–4 || Park (13–9) || Neagle (8–7) || Shaw (38) || 36,254 || 58–74
|-  style="text-align:center; background:#bfb;"
| 133 || August 31 || @ Giants || 5–2 || Thomson (2–5) || Ortiz (14–8) || Powell (5) || 41,081 || 59–74
|-

|-  style="text-align:center; background:#fbb;"
| 134 || September 1 || @ Giants || 2–1 || Nen (4–3) || Speier (3–2) || || 41,034 || 59–75
|-  style="text-align:center; background:#fbb;"
| 135 || September 2 || @ Giants || 3–1 || Hernández (12–13) || Chacón (6–9) || Nen (38) || 41,812 || 59–76
|-  style="text-align:center; background:#bfb;"
| 136 || September 3 || @ Giants || 4–1 || Jennings (3–0) || Rueter (12–11) || Powell (6) || 41,528 || 60–76
|-  style="text-align:center; background:#bfb;"
| 137 || September 4 || Dodgers || 5–2 || Neagle (9–7) || Baldwin (9–8) || Powell (7) || 30,455 || 61–76
|-  style="text-align:center; background:#fbb;"
| 138 || September 5 || Dodgers || 7–2 || Herges (9–8) || Myers (1–3) || || 31,791 || 61–77
|-  style="text-align:center; background:#fbb;"
| 139 || September 6 || Dodgers || 9–5 || Adams (12–6) || Hampton (13–11) || || 31,407 || 61–78
|-  style="text-align:center; background:#bfb;"
| 140 || September 7 || Giants || 3–2 (12) || Miceli (2–5) || Worrell (2–3) || || 33,473 || 62–78
|-  style="text-align:center; background:#fbb;"
| 141 || September 8 || Giants || 7–3 || Rueter (13–11) || Jennings (3–1) || || 32,825 || 62–79
|-  style="text-align:center; background:#fbb;"
| 142 || September 9 || Giants || 9–4 (11) || Gomes (6–3) || Belitz (0–1) || || 36,862 || 62–80
|-  style="text-align:center; background:#fbb;"
| 143 || September 17 || Diamondbacks || 7–3 || Johnson (19–6) || Davis (1–4) || || 31,111 || 62–81
|-  style="text-align:center; background:#bfb;"
| 144 || September 18 || Diamondbacks || 10–9 || Myers (2–3) || Kim (5–6) || || 30,552 || 63–81
|-  style="text-align:center; background:#bfb;"
| 145 || September 19 || Diamondbacks || 8–2 || Hampton (14–11) || Lopez (8–18) || || 30,301 || 64–81
|-  style="text-align:center; background:#fbb;"
| 146 || September 20 || @ Expos || 8–3 || Lloyd (9–5) || Powell (4–3) || || 3,307 || 64–82
|-  style="text-align:center; background:#bfb;"
| 147 || September 21 || @ Expos || 11–9 (11) || Davis (2–4) || Mota (1–3) || || 10,510 || 65–82
|-  style="text-align:center; background:#fbb;"
| 148 || September 22 || @ Expos || 3–1 || Yoshii (4–5) || Elarton (4–9) || Strickland (6) || 9,707 || 65–83
|-  style="text-align:center; background:#bfb;"
| 149 || September 23 || @ Expos || 5–3 || Speier (4–2) || Stewart (1–1) || Jiménez (16) || 9,282 || 66–83
|-  style="text-align:center; background:#bfb;"
| 150 || September 24 || Padres || 15–11 || Speier (5–2) || Lundquist (0–1) || || 30,774 || 67–83
|-  style="text-align:center; background:#fbb;"
| 151 || September 25 || Padres || 8–7 || Tollberg (8–4) || Hampton (14–12) || Hoffman (40) || 31,193 || 67–84
|-  style="text-align:center; background:#fbb;"
| 152 || September 26 || Padres || 3–1 || Lawrence (5–4) || Speier (5–3) || Hoffman (41) || 30,711 || 67–85
|-  style="text-align:center; background:#bfb;"
| 153 || September 27 || Padres || 13–9 || Belitz (1–1) || Herndon (2–6) || || 31,162 || 68–85
|-  style="text-align:center; background:#bfb;"
| 154 || September 28 || Brewers || 6–5 || Powell (5–3) || Leskanic (2–6) || || 44,109 || 69–85
|-  style="text-align:center; background:#bfb;"
| 155 || September 29 || Brewers || 14–12 || Speier (6–3) || Haynes (8–16) || Jiménez (17) || 35,848 || 70–85
|-  style="text-align:center; background:#bfb;"
| 156 || September 30 || Brewers || 10–0 || Thomson (3–5) || D'Amico (2–4) || || 31,545 || 71–85
|-

|-  style="text-align:center; background:#fbb;"
| 157 || October 2 || @ Diamondbacks || 10–1 || Johnson (21–6) || Hampton (14–13) || || 36,263 || 71–86
|-  style="text-align:center; background:#fbb;"
| 158 || October 3 || @ Diamondbacks || 4–3 || Schilling (22–6) || Chacón (6–10) || Kim (18) || 32,521 || 71–87
|-  style="text-align:center; background:#fbb;"
| 159 || October 4 || @ Diamondbacks || 5–4 || Anderson (4–9) || Neagle (9–8) || Kim (19) || 29,382 || 71–88
|-  style="text-align:center; background:#bfb;"
| 160 || October 5 || @ Padres || 4–0 || Jennings (4–1) || Jarvis (12–11) || || 27,646 || 72–88
|-  style="text-align:center; background:#fbb;"
| 161 || October 6 || @ Padres || 10–4 || Tollberg (10–4) || Elarton (4–10) || || 30,637 || 72–89
|-  style="text-align:center; background:#bfb;"
| 162 || October 7 || @ Padres || 14–5 || Thomson (4–5) || Lawrence (5–5) || || 60,103 || 73–89
|-

Player stats

Batting

Starters by position 
Note: Pos = Position; G = Games played; AB = At bats; H = Hits; Avg. = Batting average; HR = Home runs; RBI = Runs batted in

Other batters 
Note: G = Games played; AB = At bats; H = Hits; Avg. = Batting average; HR = Home runs; RBI = Runs batted in

Pitching

Starting pitchers 
Note: G = Games pitched; IP = Innings pitched; W = Wins; L = Losses; ERA = Earned run average; SO = Strikeouts

Other pitchers 
Note: G = Games pitched; IP = Innings pitched; W = Wins; L = Losses; ERA = Earned run average; SO = Strikeouts

Relief pitchers 
Note: G = Games pitched; W = Wins; L = Losses; SV = Saves; ERA = Earned run average; SO = Strikeouts

Farm system

LEAGUE CHAMPIONS: Salem

References

2001 Colorado Rockies at Baseball Reference
2001 Colorado Rockies at Baseball Almanac

Colorado Rockies seasons
Colorado Rockies season
Colorado Rockies
2000s in Denver